Ivette María Cordovez Usuga (born June 24, 1979) is a Panamanian news presenter, actress, model, and former winner of Señorita Panamá. She was born in Panama City, Panama. 
She started her acting career after participating in beauty pageants.

Pageant career 
Cordovez competed in the national beauty pageant Señorita Panamá 2000, on Thursday September 1, 2000 and obtained the title of Señorita Panamá Universo.

Ivette went on to represent Panamá in Miss Universe 2001, which took place in Puerto Rico. She was the official representative of Panamá  in  the 50th Miss Universe 2001 pageant, held at Coliseo Rubén Rodríguez, Bayamón, Puerto Rico on May 11, 2001.

Acting career 
She worked in TV soap-operas and miniseries.

In 2008 she worked in the comedic Mexican telenovela Las Tontas No Van al Cielo which was successful in  Latin America. After finishing filming with Las Tontas No Van al Cielo, Cordovez worked in Sortilegio, the popular series La Rosa de Guadalupe and Central de Abastos, among others.

Television 
2009: Sortilegio
2008: Las Tontas No Van al Cielo
2008: Cuidado con el ángel 
2008: En nombre del amor               
2008: Un gancho al corazón
2007: Palabra de Mujer

Theatre
Cordovez returned to Panama in 2011 and participated in the female version of Neil Simon's The Odd Couple, where she played Vera.

TVN

Ivette Cordovez is currently working as an executive at TVN. There she set up an Acting for TV course, directed by Alejandra Israel, the former Televisa's acting teacher.

She started as the news presenter for TVN Weekend News on November, 2011.

References

External links
 Señorita Panamá  official website

1979 births
Living people
Miss Universe 2001 contestants
Panamanian actresses
Panamanian beauty pageant winners
Señorita Panamá